German submarine U-54 was a Type VIIB U-boat of Nazi Germany's Kriegsmarine during World War II.

Design
German Type VIIB submarines were preceded by the shorter Type VIIA submarines. U-54 had a displacement of  when at the surface and  while submerged. She had two shafts and two  propellers.

U-54 was fitted with five  torpedo tubes (four fitted at the bow and one at the stern), fourteen torpedoes, one  SK C/35 naval gun, 220 rounds, and one  anti-aircraft gun The boat had a complement of between forty-four and sixty.

Service history
She was ordered	on 16 July 1937 and was laid down on 13 September 1938 at Friedrich Krupp Germaniawerft, Kiel, becoming yard number 589. She was launched on 15 August 1939 and commissioned under her first commander, Kapitänleutnant (Kptlt.) Georg-Heinz Michel, on 23 September of that year. Michel commanded her for her work-ups with the 7th U-boat Flotilla between 23 September and 30 November 1939. He was succeeded by Korvettenkapitän (K.Kapt.) Günter Kutschmann on 5 December, who completed the training programme by 31 December. She became an operational boat of the 7th Flotilla and set out for her first and only war patrol on 1 January 1940 in the North Sea. She did not record any successes during this cruise and was reported missing after failing to check in on 20 February.

This however has not been proven and the reason for her disappearance remains officially unknown. Part of one of her torpedoes was found on 14 March 1940 by the German patrol boat  in position .

References

Bibliography

External links

German Type VIIB submarines
U-boats commissioned in 1939
U-boats sunk in 1940
World War II submarines of Germany
World War II shipwrecks in the Atlantic Ocean
1939 ships
Ships built in Kiel
U-boats sunk by mines
Maritime incidents in February 1940